Michael Hannan may refer to:
 Michael Hannan (bishop) (1821–1882), Roman Catholic priest and archbishop
 Michael Hannan (composer) (born 1949), Australian composer, keyboardist, and musicologist
 Michael T. Hannan (born 1943), American sociologist

See also
 Michael Hanna (disambiguation)